This is a list of Crayon Shin-chan episodes that began airing in 2012 onward.

Episodes

2012

2013

2014

2015

2016

2017

2018

2019

2020

2021

References

Crayon Shin-chan
Crayon Shin-chan